Stanisław Jakub Rostworowski (28 January 1858, Kowalewszczyzna — 8 September 1888, Kraków) was a Polish artist; known primarily for his portraits; including many of his fellow artists.

Biography
He was one of eight children born on his family's estate in a small village near Białystok. His father, Roman (1826-1906), served as a Justice of the Peace. His mother, Maria (1835-1912), was a niece of the novelist and feminist, Narcyza Żmichowska, who advised her not to marry Roman. Poor management caused their farm to fail and the family moved to Warsaw, where his mother opened a tailor shop and gave piano lessons.

From 1874 to 1876, he studied at the Realschule there. Then, in 1878, when his father found work as a railway clerk, he was able to enter the Saint Petersburg State Institute of Technology. However, he also attended classes at the Imperial Academy of Fine Arts and soon abandoned his technical studies. He was awarded a small silver medal for his paintings in 1882. The following year, he took specialized classes in landscape and battle painting. That same year, he was awarded a gold medal for his depiction of Thetis bringing weapons to Achilles as he mourns over the body of Patroclus.

In 1884, he was awarded the "большая золотая медаль" (Great Gold Medal) and the title of "Artist First-Class" for his painting of Ataman Yermak's messengers at the Red Porch with Ivan the Terrible, capturing the moment when he went from anger to mercy toward the former robbers. The canvas has been kept in storage at the Yekaterinburg Museum of Fine Arts.

He received a pension from the Academy; travelling to Vienna, Munich, Spain and Italy. In 1886, he returned to Poland with his wife, Teresa (née Lubieniecki, 1857-1944), whom he had married in 1885, and settled in Kraków. They had one daughter, Maria (1886-1935). He died, aged only 30, in 1888. The cause was tuberculosis; supposedly contracted when he went out in St. Petersburg, during the winter, without sufficiently warm clothing.

References

Further reading
 
 "Stanisław Jakub Rostworowski – wielki talent, którego przedwczesna śmierć odsunęła w zapomnienie" by Karolina Zalewska @ Niezła Sztuka

External links 

 Сведения о картине «Послы Ермака..» и Ростворовском на сайте (The painting "Messengers from  Yermak") @ Ekburg TV
 Биография Ростворовского на польском языке Biography @ Polski Słownik Biograficzny (iPSB)

1858 births
1888 deaths
Polish painters
Polish male painters
Polish portrait painters
19th-century deaths from tuberculosis
People from Wysokie Mazowieckie County
Tuberculosis deaths in Poland